Ifigenia may refer to:

Books and film
Ifigenia (novel), 1924 novel by Teresa de la Parra
Ifigenia, 1950 novel Gonzalo Torrente Ballester
, directed by Iván Feo

Music
Ifigenia (Pizzetti), 1950 opera by Ildebrando Pizzetti
Ifigenia in Aulide (disambiguation)
Ifigenia in Tauride (disambiguation)

See also
Iphigenia (disambiguation)